Bogdan Rath (born 28 June 1972) is a Romanian and later Italian water polo player who competed in the 1996 Summer Olympics (for Romania) and in the 2004 Summer Olympics (for Italy).

See also
 List of sportspeople who competed for more than one nation
 List of World Aquatics Championships medalists in water polo

References

External links
 

1972 births
Living people
Italian male water polo players
Italian people of Romanian descent
Romanian male water polo players
Olympic water polo players of Romania
Olympic water polo players of Italy
Water polo players at the 1996 Summer Olympics
Water polo players at the 2004 Summer Olympics
World Aquatics Championships medalists in water polo